The Australian Manufacturing Workers Union (AMWU), or more fully the Automotive, Food, Metals, Engineering, Printing and Kindred Industries Union, is an Australian trade union. The AMWU represents a broad range of workers in the manufacturing sector, as well as associated industries, and is affiliated to the Australian Council of Trade Unions.

The union is organised into six state branches, as well as four divisions, representing different industries or occupational groups: the Manufacturing Division, the Food and Confectionery Division, the Vehicle Division and the Printing Division.

History

The Amalgamated Metal Workers Union (AMWU) was formed in 1972 with the amalgamation of three metal trade unions - the Boilermakers and Blacksmiths Society of Australia (BBS), the Sheet Metal Working Industrial Union of Australia (SMWU) and the Amalgamated Engineering Union (AEU). At its formation the AMWU had a membership of 171,000, making it the largest organisation in Australia by membership.

In 1979, the Federated Shipwrights and Ship Constructors Union of Australia amalgamated with the AMWU, which changed its name to the Amalgamated Metal Workers and Shipwrights Union (AMWSU). When the Federated Moulders’ (Metals) Union amalgamated in 1983, the union's name changed slightly to the Amalgamated Metals Foundry & Shipwrights’ Union, but in 1985 reverted to be the Amalgamated Metal Workers’ Union. By 1987 the union's membership had declined slightly to 163,400.

During the 1980s the AMWU played a pivotal role in securing the support of the left wing of the Australian union movement for the Prices and Incomes Accord, which involved unions agreeing to restrict their demands for wage increases in exchange for the federal government implementing policies to advance the 'social wage', including universal health insurance, investment in education and social welfare.

In 1991 the AMWU amalgamated with the Association of Draughting Supervisory & Technical Employees (ADSTE) created the Metals and Engineering Workers’ Union. Two years later a further amalgamation with the Vehicle Builders Employees’ Federation of Australia resulted in the Automotive Metals & Engineering Union. In 1994 the union merged with the Confectionery Workers' and Food Preservers' Union, itself a recent amalgamation of the Food Preservers' Union of Australia and the Confectionery Workers' Union of Australia, to form the Automotive Food Metals and Engineering Union. Finally, the Printing and Kindred Industries Union amalgamated to form the printing division of the Automotive, Food, Metals, Engineering, Printing and Kindred Industries Union.

During the 1990s and 2000s membership of the AMWU declined dramatically, reflecting the rapid decline of the manufacturing sector in Australia, falling from 200,000 in 1995 to 157,000 in 2005. Losses then accelerated, membership more than halving over the following decade to 68,008 in 2017.

National Secretaries
1973: Jack Garland
1981: Jack Kidd
1988: George Campbell
1996: Doug Cameron
2008: Dave Oliver
2012: Paul Bastian
2020: Steve Murphy

Political Activity
The AMWU is one of the most powerful unions in the Labor Left faction of the Australian Labor Party. During the 2010 Australian federal election the CFMEU and AMWU donated a total of $60,000 to the Greens.

Further reading
 Reeves, Andrew and Andrew Dettmer (eds.) Organise, educate, control: the AMWU in Australia, 1852-2012. Clayton, Victoria: Monash University Publishing, 2013. .

References

External links

Australian Trade Union Archive entry for AMWU

Trade unions in Australia
Manufacturing trade unions
Trade unions established in 1972
1972 establishments in Australia